Michael Patrick Moran (February 8, 1944 – February 4, 2004) was an American actor and playwright.

Life and career
Moran was born in Yuba City, California, but his family moved frequently because his father was a United States Army officer. While his family was living in Cedar Grove, New Jersey, he graduated from Passaic Valley Regional High School in Little Falls. While he was a student there, he designed and supervised construction of an elaborate set for a benefit production of Robert Merrill's musical Take Me Along. He gained some of his first experience under Gilbert Rathbun in the theater program at Seton Hall University in South Orange, N.J. - though he was not a student there - and at the Theater on the Mall in Paramus, where he worked with director Robert Ludlum, who had not yet launched his career as a novelist. Moran's roles at Seton Hall included Sir Toby Belch in William Shakespeare's Twelfth Night and "Mortimer, the Man Who Dies" in The Fantasticks by Harvey Schmidt and Tom Jones. 

Moran moved to the Lower East Side of New York City in 1966 and was educated at New York University's Tisch School of the Arts. He became a member of the theatre groups the Manhattan Project and the Cooper-Keaton Group. Both groups produced plays written by Moran, including Call Me Charlie, starring Danny DeVito. He also appeared in several productions for the New York Shakespeare Festival, and in off-Broadway productions including Sheridan's The Rivals (1984, Lion Theatre, 422 West 42nd Street), of which one critic wrote, "Michael P. Moran, built like a barrel, comes close to stealing the show as he roars and blusters through the role of Sir Anthony." 

Moran appeared in several plays by Horton Foote at the Ensemble Studio Theatre: The Prisoner's Song (2002), Everything That Rises Must Converge, and The Belmont Avenue Social Club. The New York Times wrote of Prisoner's Song "Pitch-perfect performances by the four-member cast make it work. ... The galvanizing force, though, is Michael P. Moran's aching rendition of Luther Wright."

In 2002–2003, he portrayed Fred "Pap" Rose in the musical Hank Williams: Lost Highway by Randal Myler and Mike Harelik, based on the life of Hank Williams. The show played to a positive critical response at the Manhattan Ensemble Theatre in Soho and then at the Little Shubert Theatre in Midtown, with one reviewer writing "the cast is strong, particularly Michael P. Moran as Hank's manager Fred Rose".

Moran died in a New York hospital, from Guillain–Barré syndrome, 4 days before his 60th birthday.

Filmography

Film

 1979 Squeeze Play! as Bozo
 1981 Knightriders as Cook
 1983 The Survivors as Gun Salesman
 1983 Scarface as Nick 'The Pig'
 1985 Marie as Bill Thompson
 1986 Nine 1/2 Weeks as Flea Market Chicken Seller 
 1989 Physical Evidence as Tony Reugger
 1989 Lean on Me as Mr. O'Malley 
 1989 Fletch Lives as Morgue Attendant 
 1989 Ghostbusters II as Frank, The Doorman 
 1990 State of Grace The Bartender 
 1991 Loser as Heavy Lawyer
 1991 Age Isn't Everything
 1992 The Turning as Jim McCutcheon
 1993 Carlito's Way as Party Guest 
 1994 The Paper as Chuck 
 1994 Radioland Murders as Cop #9
 1996 Mother Night as Violent Man
 1996 Sleepers as Judge #1 
 1998 A Perfect Murder as Bobby Fain 
 1998 Harvest as Henry Upton
 1999 Just the Ticket as Max 'Fat Max'
 1999 The Eden Myth as Dan Morgan
 2000 Prince of Central Park as Security Guard
 2002 City by the Sea as Herb
 2003 Undermind as Grady
 2003 Little Kings as Father Connolly (final film role)

Television
 1990 H.E.L.P. as Captain Cragie
 1992 Mathnet as Long John Silverplate
 1992 Square One TV as Long John Silverplate / Lou
 1994 Matlock as Vic
 1995 Microsoft Windows 95 Video Guide as Boris
 1995 The Cosby Mysteries
 2000-2001 Deadline 
 2001 The Big Heist as Louis 'The Whale'
 2001 Law & Order: Criminal Intent as Mr. De Santis
 1991-2002 Law & Order as Shannon Forsythe / Probation Officer / Judge Horace Barclay / Liotta / Limo Driver 
 2002 NYPD Blue as Hot Dog Vendor

References

External links
A Perfect Murder Biography

1944 births
2004 deaths
American male film actors
Male actors from California
Tisch School of the Arts alumni
People from Cedar Grove, New Jersey
People from Yuba City, California
Seton Hall University people
20th-century American male actors